National Key Universities of Vietnam are national (leading regional and national) universities, universities, and research-oriented institutes, which are given priority by the government to autonomy such as: be self-printed and doctoral degrees; have full authority to send officials to study abroad, except for cases of studying with the state budget; be actively invited and receive lecturers and foreign students to study and teach; It is suggested to open training disciplines not included in the training list. In addition, the Principal will decide the budget for equipment investment and capital construction without having to go through the Ministry of Education and Training of Vietnam.

Currently, in Vietnam, there are 22 higher education institutions selected to be built into national key universities including 2 national universities, 3 regional universities and 17 universities and institutes according to fields and key national branches (pedagogy, medicine, economics, agriculture, technology, military engineering, military medicine, maritime, journalism - media).

According to the government's plan, national key research universities will be built with advanced training and research qualifications to be the driving force for the development of Vietnam's university network. More than 75% of teaching staff will have a doctorate level.

Vietnam National Key University
According to the planning project, by 2020, Vietnam will have 22 national key universities and universities:

1. Hanoi National University: The first system of training and basic science research applications in the North of Vietnam.

2. Hanoi National University of Education: The leading university in the field of education and pure science research in the North of Vietnam Vietnam; incorporated in Vietnam National University, Hanoi before.

3. Ho Chi Minh City National University: The second system of training and pure science research and application schools in the South of Vietnam

4. Ho Chi Minh City University of Education (or Ho Chi Minh City Pedagogical University): The leading university in the field of education and pure science research in the South of Vietnam; incorporated in Vietnam National University, Ho Chi Minh City before.

5. Hue University: Regional University

6. University of Danang: Regional University

7. Thai Nguyen University: The regional university, the largest in the Northern Midlands and Mountains region.

8. Can Tho University: The largest and regional university in the Southwest region of Vietnam.

9. Vinh University: The regional university, the largest in the North Central region of Vietnam.

10. National Economics University: The leading university in economics and management schools in Northern Vietnam.

11. Ho Chi Minh City University of Economics: The leading university in the field of economic and management schools in Southern Vietnam.

12. Hanoi Medical University: The leading university in the field of medical and pharmaceutical schools in Northern Vietnam.

13. Ho Chi Minh City Medicine and Pharmacy University: The leading university in the field of medical and pharmaceutical schools in Southern Vietnam.

14. Hanoi University of Science and Technology: The leading university in the field of engineering and technology schools of Northern Vietnam.

15. Military Technical Academy(Le Quy Don Technical University): The leading university in the field of military technology and defense technology industry in Vietnam.

16. Vietnam Maritime University: The leading university in the field of transport and logistics schools of Vietnam

17. Vietnam National University of Agriculture: The leading university in Vietnam of agriculture and forestry schools

18. Military Medical Academy: The leading university of military medicine and pharmacy in Vietnam.

19. People's Security Academy, under the Ministry of Public Security

20. Hanoi Law University

21. Ho Chi Minh City University of Law

22. Academy of Journalism and Communication: The leading university in the field of journalism and media industry.

Universities that are striving to be listed as national key universities 
 Quy Nhon University
 National University of Civil Engineering, under the Ministry of Education and Training.
 Hanoi University of Natural Resources and Environment
University of Transport Technology 
People's Police Academy, under the Ministry of Public Security

Notes

Universities in Vietnam